The Colico–Chiavenna railway is a rail line in Lombardy, Italy, opened on 9 September 1886.

The line was part of a miscarried project of a Milan–Chur railway through a planned Splugen pass tunnel, which was cancelled after the success of the line through the Gotthard tunnel.

See also
 List of railway lines in Italy

References

Footnotes

Sources
 
 

Railway lines in Lombardy
Railway lines opened in 1886